Asmussen is a Danish patronymic surname. People with the name include:

 Cash Asmussen (born 1962), American jockey
 Don Asmussen (born 1962), American cartoonist
 Erik Asmussen (1913–1998), Danish architect
 Fips Asmussen (1938–2020), stage name of German comedian and entertainer Rainer Pries
 Gunnar Asmussen (born 1944), Danish retired cyclist
 Hans Asmussen (1898—1968), German theologian
 Jes Peter Asmussen (1928–2002), Danish Iranologist
 Jörg Asmussen (born 1966), German economist and politician
 Kristian Asmussen (born 1971), Danish handballer
 Nicholas Asmussen (1871–1941), Canadian entrepreneur and politician
 Roger Asmussen (1936–2015), German politician
 Steve Asmussen (born 1965), American horse trainer
Stig Asmussen, American video game developer
 Svend Asmussen (1916–2017), Danish violinist
 Tom Asmussen (1878–1963), American baseball player

Danish-language surnames
Patronymic surnames